Herzberger is a surname. Notable people with the surname include:

Magda Herzberger (1926–2021), Romanian author, poet and composer
Maximilian Herzberger (1899–1982), German mathematician and physicist
Radhika Herzberger (born 1938), Indian writer, educationist and scholar in Sanskrit and Indology

See also
Herzberg (disambiguation)
Herzenberg
Hertzberger